Dortmund West station is a railway station in the Dortmund district of Marten in the German state of North Rhine-Westphalia. It is classified by Deutsche Bahn as a category 6 station. It was opened on 3 June 1984 on the Osterath–Dortmund Süd railway completed between the old Dortmund-Dorstfeld station and the old Dortmund Süd (south) station by the Rhenish Railway Company on 19 November 1874 and electrified on 25 May 1984. It is proposed to build platforms on the Elberfeld–Dortmund railway to provide interchange with S-Bahn line S 5.

It is served by Rhine-Ruhr S-Bahn line S 4 at 30-minute intervals (15-minute intervals in the peak between Dortmund-Lütgendortmund and ).

It is also served by bus routes 452 (Saarlandstr – Funkenburg – Spähenfelde + Dortmund Hbf (475 – Mengede)), every 30 minutes) and 453 (Saarlandstr – Märkische Str – Schüren + Dortmund Hbf – Anne-Frank-GS), every 30 minutes), both operated by DSW21.

References

S4 (Rhine-Ruhr S-Bahn)
Rhine-Ruhr S-Bahn stations
Railway stations in Dortmund
Railway stations in Germany opened in 1984
1984 establishments in West Germany